Larry Wright (born c. 1975) is a well-known New York City street performer. He is credited as the first major drummer to use five gallon plastic buckets instead of a normal drum kit. He uses his foot to lift the bucket changing the sound patterns.

He has appeared in commercials, Mariah Carey's "Someday" video, Bring in 'da Noise, Bring in 'da Funk as well as the movie Green Card. In 2011 he appeared in the film The Yellow Card  directed by Enrique Pedráza Botero. It is a short documentary based on subway performers in New York City, where Larry Wright and his wife Sonia Wright are one of the main acts in the film as they play their music and are being interviewed. He is listed among the musicians performing on Ritual Beating System by Bahia Black, a 2016 CD produced by Bill Laswell. The CD features a track, "Uma Viagen Del Baldes de Larry Wright" (translation: A journey of the buckets of Larry Wright), which he co-wrote with Carlinhos Brown. There is an independent movie about him as a high school student.

He has played since he was five years old, and met his wife while playing in the New York City Subway. His favorite drummers are Eyeon, Tito Puente, Max Roach, and Buddy Rich. He and his wife can typically be found at the Union Square, Penn Station, Port Authority, and 59th and Lexington subway stations.

A more recent interview with Larry and his wife Sonia appears in Issue Four of The Drummer's Journal.

References

External links
 Short film about a young Larry Wright from 1990
 Larry Wright and his wife performance in New York subway on 2010
 Drummerworld overview
 Film about Larry Wright
 1990 Levi's 501 commercial featuring Wright, dir: Spike Lee
 A Lounge Lizard Alone documentary about John Lurie featuring Wright at age 15

1975 births
Culture of New York City
Living people
American street performers
American male drummers
American performance artists
African-American drummers
20th-century American drummers
21st-century American drummers
Musicians from New York City
20th-century American male musicians
21st-century American male musicians
20th-century African-American musicians
21st-century African-American musicians